Loxostege annaphilalis is a moth in the family Crambidae. It was described by Augustus Radcliffe Grote in 1881. It is found in North America, where it has been recorded from south-western California, from Kern County to San Diego County.

References

Moths described in 1881
Pyraustinae